The 37th World Cup season began in October 2002 on Sölden, Austria, and concluded in March 2003 at the World Cup finals in Lillehammer, Norway.  The overall winners were Stephan Eberharter of Austria and Janica Kostelić of Croatia.

A break in the schedule was for the 2003 World Championships, held in St. Moritz, Switzerland, from 2–16 February 2003.

Calendar

Men

Ladies

Men 
At the World Cup finals in Lillehammer (Kvitfjell, Hafjell), only the best racers were allowed to compete and only the top 15 finishers were awarded with points.

Overall 

see complete table

Downhill 

see complete table

In Men's Downhill World Cup 2002/03 the all results count.

Super G 

see complete table

In Men's Super G World Cup 2002/03 all results count.

Giant Slalom 

see complete table

In Men's Giant Slalom World Cup 2002/03 all results count. Michael von Grünigen won his fourth Giant Slalom World Cup.

Slalom 

see complete table

In Men's Slalom World Cup 2002/03 the all results count. Race No. 10 at Sestriere was a K.O.-Slalom.

Combined 

see complete table

In Men's Combined World Cup 2002/03 both results count.

Ladies 
At the World Cup finals in Lillehammer (Kvitfjell, Hafjell), only the best racers were allowed to compete and only the top 15 finishers were awarded with points.

Overall 

see complete table

Downhill 

see complete table

In Women's Downhill World Cup 2002/03 all results count.

Super G 

see complete table

In Women's Super G World Cup 2002/03 all results count.

Giant Slalom 

see complete table

In Women's Giant Slalom World Cup 2002/03 all results count.

Slalom 

see complete table

In Women's Slalom World Cup 2002/03 all results count. Race No. 11 at Sestriere was a K.O.-Slalom.

Combined 

see complete table

In Women's Combined World Cup 2002/03 only one competition was held.

Footnotes

References

External links
FIS-ski.com - World Cup standings - 2003

FIS Alpine Ski World Cup
World Cup
World Cup